nStigate Games (formerly Nihilistic Software) was an American video game developer based in Novato, California.

History
Nihilistic was founded in March 1998 by Ray Gresko, Robert Huebner, and Steve Tietze. Gresko and Huebner had formerly worked at LucasArts, and Tietze had worked at Rogue Entertainment. Many of Nihilistic's employees were drawn from LucasArts, working on games such as Jedi Knight.

The first game produced by Nihilistic was Vampire: The Masquerade - Redemption, set in a role-playing world created by White Wolf. Released in 2000, Vampire: The Masquerade - Redemption was published by Activision for Microsoft Windows and Apple Macintosh computers.

For their next project, Nihilistic began to develop StarCraft: Ghost, supervised by StarCraft creator Blizzard Entertainment. In mid-2004,  Nihilistic ceased working on StarCraft: Ghost, although the circumstances behind this are not entirely clear. The project was taken up by Swingin' Ape Studios, which was later bought by Blizzard. Finally in March 2006, Blizzard Entertainment announced that StarCraft: Ghost was placed on indefinite hold.

Meanwhile, in 2005, Nihilistic completed development on Marvel Nemesis: Rise of the Imperfects, a fighting game based on Marvel Comics' various superheroes. Marvel Nemesis: Rise of the Imperfects was published by Electronic Arts, for the PlayStation 2, Xbox and GameCube.

Nihilistic released their first 'next-gen' title, Conan for both the PlayStation 3 and Xbox 360 game consoles. According to a preview article in the March 2007 issue of Game Informer, Conan is an action/adventure game based on Robert E. Howard's famous sword and sorcery hero, Conan the Barbarian. This title was released by the publisher THQ on October 23, 2007.

In the fall of 2009, Konami published Nihilistic Software's first downloadable game, Zombie Apocalypse on Xbox Live for the Xbox 360 and on the PlayStation Network for the PlayStation 3. Zombie Apocalypse is multiplayer, arcade-style dual stick shooter with zombies as the opponent.

They developed PlayStation Move Heroes for the PlayStation 3 (for the PlayStation Move) which was released in March 2011.

On May 29, 2012, Nihilistic released Resistance: Burning Skies for the PlayStation Vita.

On October 17, 2012, Nihilistic reorganized their business to focus on mobile gaming, changing their name to nStigate.

On November 13, 2012, nStigate released Call of Duty: Black Ops – Declassified for the Vita. The game was widely panned critically for poor design and crippling technical problems.

The company announced that they'd began to restructure the studio once more and announced that they’d be focusing on developing digital and mobile titles, yet due to the failure of Declassified the company was unable to reach any agreements with major companies and would be forced to close the following month.

Games

References

External links
Official website via Internet Archive

Defunct video game companies of the United States
Video game development companies
Software companies based in the San Francisco Bay Area
Defunct companies based in the San Francisco Bay Area
Companies based in Marin County, California
Video game companies established in 1998
Video game companies disestablished in 2012
1998 establishments in California
2012 disestablishments in California
Novato, California